Eugenia orites is a species of plant in the family Myrtaceae, the myrtles. It is a tree endemic to Peninsular Malaysia. It is threatened by habitat loss.

References

orites
Endemic flora of Peninsular Malaysia
Trees of Peninsular Malaysia
Conservation dependent plants
Taxonomy articles created by Polbot